Ninth Moon Black is an American instrumental band from the Pacific Northwest, conjuring musical influences from the realms of psychedelic, ambient and post-metal. The band is known for its intricate melodic passages, emotionally driven progressions and unique yet cohesive song structures.

Writing and performing music that is very cinematic in nature, Ninth Moon Black creates an engaging experience for the listener, often showing self-produced experimental films or providing an epic soundscape for visual odysseys such as Begotten, Decasia and Man with a Movie Camera.

Since the release of their 2008 self-titled debut, Ninth Moon Black has shared the stage with bands such as Atriarch, Brothers of The Sonic Cloth, Dead Meadow, Earth, Indian, Ludicra, Melt Banana, Minsk, Wolves In The Throne Room and Yob.

Discography
Amaranthine (June 2018)
Chronophage (May 2012)
Kalyug (May 2010)
Ninth Moon Black (March 2008)

Members
 Erin Gruwell - guitar
 Eric Eiden - guitar, keyboards
 Atom Bouris - guitar
 Dana Lowry - bass
 Michael Aliotti - drums

Former members
 Jesse McMinn - guitar
 Shawn Kilmer - keyboards
 Josh Alderson - keyboards
 Caleb Jarzemkoski - bass
 Kasey Marcusky - drums

External links
 Official website
 Official Facebook page

American post-metal musical groups